Davide Cais (born 17 February 1994) is an Italian footballer who plays as a forward for Vittorio Falmec.

Career

Atalanta
Born in Vittorio Veneto, Cais started his career at Lombard club Atalanta. He was a member of the reserve team until 2013. On 1 August he was signed by Reggiana. At Reggio, he met his future Juventus "team-mate" Michele Cavion.

Juventus
On 31 January 2014 Juventus F.C. signed half of the registration rights of Cais for €40,000 cash and half of the registration rights of Simone Emmanuello. The deals made both clubs received a paper profit by the increase in intangible assets – the player contracts. Cais signed a -year contract; he immediately returned to Reggio Emilia for the rest of the 2013–14 Lega Pro Prima Divisione season. In June 2014 the co-ownership deal were renewed.

In August 2014 Cais was signed by Gubbio in a temporary deal.

On 24 June 2015 Juventus bought the remaining registration rights of Cais for €800,000, with the remaining registration rights of Emmanuello moved to opposite direction also for €800,000.

On 31 July 2015 Cais, Barlocco, Gerbaudo and Tavanti were signed by Carrarese.

On 22 July 2016 signed by Pontedera from Juventus. Circa 2016–17 season Cais also signed a new 3-year contract with Juve.

In January 2017 he returned to Juventus, but immediately loaned to Carrarese. He also spent 2017–18 season with Carrarese.

Serie C
On 11 July 2019, he signed with the newly promoted Serie C club Arzignano.

On 28 September 2020 he returned to Carrarese once again. 

On 1 February 2021 he moved to Fermana.

Eccellenza
On 30 July 2021, he joined his hometown club Vittorio Falmec, playing in the fifth-tier Eccellenza.

References

External links
 Profile at Lega Serie A 
 Profile at Italian Football Federation 
 

Italian footballers
Atalanta B.C. players
A.C. Reggiana 1919 players
A.S. Gubbio 1910 players
Juventus F.C. players
Carrarese Calcio players
Fermana F.C. players
Association football forwards
Italy youth international footballers
Serie C players
People from Vittorio Veneto
1994 births
Living people
Albissola 2010 players
Footballers from Veneto
Sportspeople from the Province of Treviso